Lucy Flucker Knox (August 2, 1756 – June 20, 1824) was an American revolutionary. She was the daughter of colonial official Thomas Flucker and Hannah Waldo, daughter of Samuel Waldo. She married Henry Knox, who became a leading officer in the Continental Army during the American Revolutionary War. Lucy accompanied Henry and lived on the military camp during the war. She accompanied Henry Knox until he retired from the army in 1794.

Early life and education 
She was born into a wealthy family of privilege.  Lucy's father, Thomas Flucker, holding office under the British colonial government wanted Lucy to marry someone of a higher social status. However, in June 1774, Lucy married Henry Knox (1750–1806). Her parents disowned her because Henry was a merchant-class suitor at the time. Her family then fled for London once Boston had fallen, and she would never see her family again.

Lucy Knox was fortunate enough to be born into a rich, Loyalist-ranked family which gave her access to homeschooled education and an extensive amount of resources at the house library. Even for a woman of elite social class, she was always regarded as someone with "extensive reading". Lucy Knox was a frequent visitor to Henry Knox's bookstore and that was where the couple first met.

Life during the American Revolutionary War 
During most of the Revolutionary War, Lucy and her husband were apart. Unfortunately, unlike other officers' wives, she wasn't able to get as many visits to the war camp. The reasoning behind Lucy Knox not receiving as many visits as other officers' wives was that she had already given up all she had (her family) for this patriotic cause and therefore her husband was resistant to her visiting and witnessing all the suffering. Even though they were separated for such a long time, Lucy and Henry didn't let their love die out and were connected through letters they sent each other. Their letters at the Gilder Lehrman Institute of American History. They provide a first-hand view of one of the closest people to General Washington as well as an insight into the life of a war-hero spouse.

Personal life 

Lucy married Henry Knox in Boston on June 16, 1774, in defiance of her Tory parents, Thomas Flucker, the crown-appointed secretary for the province of Massachusetts, and her mother Hannah Waldo Flucker, heir to the Waldo Patent in Maine, Her relationship with her parents frayed and after the bloodshed at Lexington and Concord on April 19, 1775, ended.

Henry, an artillery expert, joined the Continental Army during the Revolution, and eventually became a general as Lucy followed him through the army camps of the war. There she birthed several children, some of whom died. Lucy’s elite background enabled her to plan and preside over military celebrations in the army camps and subsequent post-Revolutionary ceremonies, including Washington’s inauguration. Ultimately Lucy birthed thirteen children but only three lived to adulthood. 

In 1795 the Knoxes moved to what is now Rockland, Maine on land which was part of  Lucy’s inheritance of the vast tracts of lands of the Waldo  Patent. There she and Henry built a nineteen-room mansion, which they named Montpelier, and where they entertained hundreds of guests. Henry died in October 1806 leaving Lucy a widow. Broken-hearted and impoverished, Lucy died in October 1824.

Lucy Flucker Knox Thatcher was one of their children. Her son, Henry Thatcher, would serve as an admiral in the Civil War.

References 

1756 births

1824 deaths

People from Boston

Women in the American Revolution
People of Massachusetts in the American Revolution